The Liberal Party (Partido Liberal, PL) was a conservative political party of Brazil, merged (2006) in the Party of the Republic. The Pentecostal Universal Church of the Kingdom of God heavily influenced the party after 1999. In the 2002 election, José Alencar of the PL was the running mate of Lula da Silva and became the vice president. At the legislative elections, 6 October 2002, the party won 26 out of 513 seats in the Chamber of Deputies and three out of 81 seats in the Senate of Brazil and supported Luiz Inácio Lula da Silva's government. Some of its members were investigated following corruption allegations and suspected involvement in the so-called "Mensalão scandal". The Universal Church has now partially left PL to create a new party named Brazilian Republican Party (PRB) in 2005.

At the last elections, held in October 2006, the Liberal Party won 23 seats in the Chamber of Deputies and one seat in the Senate for a total of three senate seats. The party did not run candidates in presidential or gubernatorial elections.

Republic Party
The Republic Party (Partido da Republica, PR) was founded on 21 December 2006 by the merger of the Liberal Party and the Party of the Reconstruction of the National Order (Partido da Reedificação da Ordem Nacional, PRONA).

External links
 Liberal Party official website

References

1985 establishments in Brazil
Classical liberal parties
Defunct political parties in Brazil
Liberal parties in Brazil
Political parties established in 1985